El Nabatat Island or Kitchener's Island, ( Geziret En Nabatat (Plant Island) or the Botanical Island) is a small, oval-shaped island in the Nile at Aswan, Egypt. It is less than a kilometer long and its width is less than ½ a kilometer. The Aswan Botanical Garden is located on the island.

Geography
El Nabatat Island is one of two major islands on the Nile in vicinity of Aswan, the other one being Elephantine. Elephantine is the larger one, and is located between El Nabatat Island and the city of Aswan (east bank). Therefore, it can be hard to see the smaller El Nabatat Island from Aswan: "Aswan disappears behind Elephantine Island".

History
The island was previously known as Kitchener's Island, named after Lord Kitchener who owned it.
He was gifted the island, when he served as Consul-General in Egypt from 29 September 1911 to June 1914.

It later passed into the property of the Egyptian government and was used as a research station called the Botanical Research Institute, Aswân Botanic Island.

Aswan Botanical Garden
The island, as a whole, constitutes the Aswan Botanical Garden. One can view the many types of subtropical, exotic, and rare plantings and trees such as the Royal Palm tree and the Sabal Palm tree. The collection was begun by Lord Kitchener and cared for since. The gardens are popular among the local people and tourists, as a place to go for a quiet afternoon away from the noise of the city, and for weekend picnics. The island and gardens can be reached by felucca that reach the Southeastern side of the small island.

Gallery

References

Islands of the Nile
River islands of Egypt
Botanical gardens in Egypt
Parks in Egypt
Aswan
Tourist attractions in Egypt